Zuclo was a comune (municipality) in Trentino in the northern Italian region Trentino-Alto Adige/Südtirol, located about  west of Trento.  It was merged with Bolbeno to form a new municipality, Borgo Lares.

Cities and towns in Trentino-Alto Adige/Südtirol